Sushant may refer to:

 Sushant Singh Rajput, an Indian actor
 Sushant Singh, an Indian actor
 Sushant Divgikar, an Indian model
 Sushant School of Art and Architecture